Dennis Nurkse is a poet from Brooklyn.

Life
Nurkse is the son of the eminent Estonian economist Ragnar Nurkse. He has taught workshops at Rikers Island, and his poems about prison life appeared in The American Poetry Review, Evergreen Review, The New Yorker, The Paris Review, TriQuarterly, The Kenyon Review, and other magazines.  He has taught at The New School University and Columbia University, and is currently on the faculty at Sarah Lawrence College. He has translated anonymous medieval and flamenco Spanish lyric poems and has written about the Spanish pastoral poems by contemporary Giannina Braschi. His work has appeared in The Evergreen Review, The New Yorker, The Atlantic Monthly, Poetry, The American Poetry Review, The Kenyon Review, The Times Literary Supplement, Ploughshares, The Paris Review. His subjects have included mental health, trauma, and September 11 terrorist attacks.

Honors and awards
 2007 Guggenheim Fellow
 1990 Whiting Award
 NEA fellowship
 NYFA fellowships

Bibliography

Poetry 
Collections
 Staggered Lights, Owl Creek Press, (July 1990), 
 Voices Over Water, Graywolf Press (July 1993), 
 Leaving Xaia, Four Way Books
 The Rules of Paradise, Four Way books
 The Fall, Knopf  
 
 The Border Kingdom, Alfred A. Knopf, August 8, 2008
 A Night in Brooklyn, Alfred A. Knopf, 2012.
List of poems

Anthologies

References

External links
 Interview with Dennis Nurkse in the Bloomsbury Review
Profile at The Whiting Foundation

Poets from New York (state)
Writers from Brooklyn
The New Yorker people
Sarah Lawrence College faculty
National Endowment for the Arts Fellows
American male poets
Living people
American people of Estonian descent
Year of birth missing (living people)
The New School faculty
Columbia University faculty